Brett de Geus (born November 4, 1997) is an American professional baseball pitcher for the York Revolution of the Atlantic League of Professional Baseball. He previously played in Major League Baseball (MLB) for the Texas Rangers and Arizona Diamondbacks.

Amateur career
de Geus attended Foothill High School in Pleasanton, California. He was not selected in the 2015 Major League Baseball draft, and thus enrolled at Cabrillo College in Aptos, California, where he played college baseball. As a freshman at Cabrillo in 2016, de Geus earned all-conference honors. As a sophomore in 2017, he went 9–3 with a 1.94 ERA over 16 games (14 starts).

Professional career

Los Angeles Dodgers organization
After the season, de Geus was selected by the Los Angeles Dodgers in the 33rd round of the 2017 Major League Baseball draft.

de Geus signed with the Dodgers and made his professional debut in 2018 with the Ogden Raptors, going 4–5 with a 7.26 ERA over 15 games (14 starts). In 2019, he began the year with the Great Lakes Loons before being promoted to the Rancho Cucamonga Quakes in June. Over 39 relief appearances between the two clubs, he pitched to a 6–2 record with a 1.75 ERA, striking out 72 over  innings. Following the season, he was selected to play in the Arizona Fall League, where he was named an All-Star.

de Geus was a non-roster invite to 2020 spring training. de Geus did not play in a game in 2020 due to the cancellation of the minor league season because of the COVID-19 pandemic.

Texas Rangers
de Geus was selected by the Texas Rangers with the second pick in the 2020 Rule 5 draft. He made the Rangers' Opening Day roster in 2021. On April 1, 2021, de Geus made his major league debut, surrendering three earned runs in one inning pitched. de Geus was designated for assignment on June 23, 2021, after posting a 8.44 ERA over 19 games for Texas.

Arizona Diamondbacks
On June 25, 2021, de Geus was claimed off waivers by the Arizona Diamondbacks. Over 28 relief appearances with the Diamondbacks, he went 3–2 with a 6.56 ERA and 15 strikeouts. On November 26, 2021, de Geus was designated for assignment. He cleared waivers and was outrighted to Triple-A on November 30. On June 7, 2022, de Geus was released.

York Revolution
On June 22, 2022, de Geus signed with the York Revolution of the Atlantic League of Professional Baseball. He struggled in 33 games, going 2–2 with a 6.43 ERA and 31 strikeouts in 35.0 innings.

See also
Rule 5 draft results

References

External links

1997 births
Living people
People from Pleasanton, California
Baseball players from California
Major League Baseball pitchers
Texas Rangers players
Arizona Diamondbacks players
Cabrillo Seahawks baseball players
Ogden Raptors players
Great Lakes Loons players
Rancho Cucamonga Quakes players
Glendale Desert Dogs players
York Revolution players